Ilex williamsii is a species of plant in the family Aquifoliaceae. It is endemic to Honduras. It is a seldom-collected cloud forest species. The plant is critically endangered as of 1998.

References

williamsii
Endemic flora of Honduras
Critically endangered flora of North America
Taxonomy articles created by Polbot
Plants described in 1951